Robert Gordon is an American screenwriter and film producer. His writing credits consist of Addicted to Love (1997), Galaxy Quest (1999), Men in Black II (2002), and Lemony Snicket's A Series of Unfortunate Events (2004). He also was an associate producer on Sky Captain and the World of Tomorrow (2004).

Filmography
Addicted to Love (1997) (Writer)
Galaxy Quest (1999) (Screenplay)
Men in Black II (2002) (Screenplay/Story)
Lemony Snicket's A Series of Unfortunate Events (2004) (Screenplay)
Sky Captain and the World of Tomorrow (2004) (Associate Producer)
Wonder Park (2019) (Story)

References

External links

Living people
American male screenwriters
Year of birth missing (living people)
Nebula Award winners
Hugo Award-winning writers